Susannah Johnson (born September 30, 1990) is an American gymnast. She was a senior-level gymnast for the United States Gymnastics national team. Johnson retired in November 2009 after the Trampoline and Tumbling World Championships and is now a trampoline instructor.

Johnson is originally from Roanoke, Virginia.

References

1990 births
Living people
American female trampolinists
21st-century American women